Miharu Kobayashi (born 12 October 1992) is a Japanese professional footballer who plays as a defender for WE League club Nojima Stella Kanagawa Sagamihara.

Club career 
Kobayashi made her WE League debut on 12 September 2021.

References 

Living people
1992 births
Japanese women's footballers
Women's association football defenders
Association football people from Kanagawa Prefecture
Sportspeople from Yokohama
Nojima Stella Kanagawa Sagamihara players
WE League players